Ancystropus is a genus of mites in the family Spinturnicidae. There are about seven described species in Ancystropus, found in Asia, the Middle East, Africa, and South Pacific islands.

The species of Ancystropus, like the other members of this family, are parasites of bats. They live primarily on the wing and tail membranes of bats throughout all stages of life.

Species
These seven species belong to the genus Ancystropus:
 Ancystropus aequatorialis Estrada-Peña, Ballesta & Ibañez, 1992
 Ancystropus aethiopicus Hirst, 1923
 Ancystropus eonycteris Delfinado & Baker, 1963
 Ancystropus leleupi Benoit, 1959
 Ancystropus notopteris Uchikawa, 1990
 Ancystropus taprobanius (Turk, 1950)
 Ancystropus zeleborii Kolenati, 1856

References

Mesostigmata
Articles created by Qbugbot